The 2013 IAAF Diamond League is the fourth edition of the Diamond League, an annual series of fourteen one-day track and field meetings.

The series began on 10 May in Doha, Qatar and ended on 6 September in Brussels, Belgium.

Calendar

Results

Events not included in the Diamond League are marked in grey background in the below tables.

Men

Track

 In Doha, the 3000m was counted to the Diamond League standings for the 5000m.
 In London, the Mile run was counted to the Diamond League standings for the 1500m.

Field

Women

Track

 In Stockholm, the 3000m was counted to the Diamond League standings for the 5000m.

Field

References

Results
Results Archive. IAAF Diamond League (archived). Retrieved on 2015-05-17.

External links
Official website

Diamond League
Diamond League